The Bernasconi Institute is an architecturally-significant primary school in the Parque Patricios section of Buenos Aires.

Overview

An estate on an eight-hectare (20 acre) property in Buenos Aires' southside became the site of a homemade museum in 1866, when 14-year-old Francisco Moreno and his father classified and mounted their extensive collection of fossils and artifacts, gathered in excursions along the vast lot. Following his landmark exploration of Patagonia during the 1870s and '80s, Moreno established a charitable school at the estate, soon becoming a magnet for the largely underprivileged children of the Nueva Pompeya area. Selling the property to Swiss Italian shoe manufacturer Félix Bernasconi, Moreno's dream for a landmark school at the site was included by the Swiss industrialist in his will. Bernasconi's death in 1914 was followed by lobbying for federal contributions to the project on the part of Moreno, who leveraged the prestige he earned in his role in the Boundary treaty of 1881 between Chile and Argentina and as Assistant Director of the National Education Council to secure funding for the new school.

Passed the Argentine Congress in 1918, Law 1420 provided the needed appropriations, and on 26 September 1921, the cornerstone was laid in a ceremony led by President Hipólito Yrigoyen. Designed by local architect Juan Waldrorp, the eclectic, Italianate-influenced building would be the largest school built in Buenos Aires to that point, and measured 140 m (460 ft) in length.

Inaugurated in April 1929, the Bernasconi Institute featured a carillon tower, two, 1200 m² (13,000 ft²) patios, two heated indoor pools, an auditorium seating 370. It would also include archaeological and natural science museumsthe Museo Geográfico Dr. Juan B. Terán and the Museo de Ciencias Naturales Dr. Ángel Gallardocreated largely with exhibits drawn from Moreno's vast collections (housed mainly in the La Plata Museum, which he directed until his death in 1919).

Heading an establishment which initially included separate boys' and girls' schools, its first director, Rosario Vera Peñaloza (1873–1950), created the Argentine Primary School Museum, which includes an antiquarian library, landscape art exhibits and botanical gardens; she and one of her successors in the post, Martha Salotti (1899–1980) were acknowledged during the late 1990s with the naming of two streets in the new, Puerto Madero district in their honor.  

Remaining among the largest in Buenos Aires, the institute's four primary schools enroll around 3,600 students yearly, and its kindergarten, around 580, as well as an adult education facility.

References and external links

Buenos Aires.gov: Instituto Bernasconi 

Schools in Argentina
Buildings and structures in Buenos Aires
Educational institutions established in 1929
School buildings completed in 1929
1929 establishments in Argentina